A schizophrenic number (also known as mock rational number) is an irrational number that displays certain characteristics of rational numbers.

Definition
The Universal Book of Mathematics defines "schizophrenic number" as:

The sequence of numbers generated by the recurrence relation f(n) = 10 f(n − 1) + n described above is:

0, 1, 12, 123, 1234, 12345, 123456, 1234567, 12345678, 123456789, 1234567900, ... .
f(49) = 1234567901234567901234567901234567901234567901229

The integer parts of their square roots,
1, 3, 11, 35, 111, 351, 1111, 3513, 11111, 35136, 111111, 351364, 1111111, ... ,
alternate between numbers with irregular digits and numbers with repeating digits, in a similar way to the alternations appearing within the fractional part of each square root.

Characteristics
The schizophrenic number shown above is the special case of a more general phenomenon that appears in the -ary expansions of square roots of the solutions of the recurrence , for all , with initial value  taken at odd positive integers . The case  and  corresponds to the example above.

Indeed, Tóth showed that these irrational numbers present schizophrenic patterns within their -ary expansion, composed of blocks that begin with a non-repeating digit block followed by a repeating digit block. When put together in base , these blocks form the schizophrenic pattern. For instance, in base , the number  begins:
1111111111111111111111111.1111111111111111111111 0600
444444444444444444444444444444444444444444444 02144
333333333333333333333333333333333333333333 175124422
666666666666666666666666666666666666666 ....

The pattern is due to the Taylor expansion of the square root of the recurrence's solution taken at odd positive integers. The various digit contributions of the Taylor expansion yield the non-repeating and repeating digit blocks that form the schizophrenic pattern.

Other properties
In some cases, instead of repeating digit sequences we find repeating digit patterns. For instance, the number :
1111111111111111111111111.1111111111111111111111111111111 01200 
202020202020202020202020202020202020202020 11010102 
00120012000012001200120012001200120012 0010
21120020211210002112100021121000211210 ...
shows repeating digit patterns in base .

Numbers that are schizophrenic in base  are also schizophrenic in base  (up to a certain limit, see Tóth).
1444444444444.4444444444 350
666666666666666666666 4112
0505050505050505050 337506
75307530753075307 40552382 ...

History
Clifford A. Pickover has said that the schizophrenic numbers were discovered by Kevin Brown.

In his book Wonders of Numbers he has so described the history of schizophrenic numbers:

See also
Almost integer
Normal number
Six nines in pi

References

External links
Mock-Rational Numbers, K. S. Brown, mathpages.

Irrational numbers
Base-dependent integer sequences